Christopher Michael Durham (born 4 March 1992) is an English cricketer. Durham is a right-handed batsman who fields as a wicket-keeper. He was born at Stockport, Greater Manchester and attended Chapel-en-le-Frith High School and Cheadle and Marple Sixth Form College.

Durham made his debut for Derbyshire in a Twenty20 match against Yorkshire in the 2012 Friends Life t20 at Headingley. Derbyshire won the toss and elected to put Yorkshire into bat. Yorkshire then made 180/5 from their 20 overs. In their chase, Derbyshire could only manage 159/9 from their 20 overs, with Durham being dismissed for a duck by Mitchell Starc.

Christopher Durham made his first and to date only First-class appearance playing for Derbyshire against Australia where he took 2 catches and got in to bat in the second innings scoring a respectable 12 not out.

References

External links

1992 births
Living people
Sportspeople from Stockport
English cricketers
Derbyshire cricketers
Wicket-keepers